The Old Capitol Building is a building in Olympia, Washington. Designed by Willis A. Ritchie, it was built from 1890 to 1892 as the Thurston County Courthouse, and served from 1905 until 1928 as the state capitol, seat of the legislature of Washington; in 1928 the legislature moved to the current Capitol Building. It is now the office of the Superintendent of Public Instruction.

The building has survived several disasters, after each of which it has been repaired. A fire in 1928 resulted in the loss of a central tower. After the 1949 Olympia earthquake, the building was evacuated and suffered severe damage to its masonry exterior that had to be repaired over the following few months at a cost of $1.1 million. 10 of the 12 towers were lost in the earthquake, along with a rotunda, the House chamber, and several galleries in the East Wing.

See also
 National Register of Historic Places listings in Thurston County, Washington

Notes

External links

 About us, Superintendent of Public Instruction: Information on the Old State Capitol Building

National Register of Historic Places in Olympia, Washington
Washington 1905
Romanesque Revival architecture in Washington (state)
Government buildings completed in 1892
Government buildings on the National Register of Historic Places in Washington (state)